Thomas White (10 November 1924 – 1998) was an English professional footballer who played as an inside forward for Sunderland.

References

1924 births
1998 deaths
English footballers
Association football inside forwards
Sunderland A.F.C. players
Worcester City F.C. players
English Football League players